Jeffrey Garlett (born 3 August 1989) is a former Australian rules footballer who played for the Melbourne Football Club and the Carlton Football Club in the Australian Football League (AFL). He is of Indigenous descent.

Background
Garlett played his early football for Burracoppin, before playing for Swan Districts in the West Australian Football League in 2007. Garlett was homeless for much of the time that he was playing for Swans, often sleeping in the back of cars going for days without eating. Once the club discovered this, he lived with Anne and Maurice Embley (parents of many Swan Districts players, including 's Andrew Embley) and with Swans captain Shane Beros. Altogether, Garlett played 21 league matches for Swans between 2007 and 2008.

AFL career

Carlton (2009–2014)

Garlett was recruited to the AFL by the Carlton Football Club with the sixth pick in the 2009 Rookie Draft.  He joined indigenous Swan Districts teammate Chris Yarran at Carlton, who was drafted in the 2008 AFL Draft at pick 6.

After playing in Carlton's 2009 NAB Cup series, he was elevated off the rookie list in place of injured ruckman Robert Warnock.  He made his debut in Round 1, 2009 against Richmond at the Melbourne Cricket Ground, scoring a goal with his first kick. Garlett played ten games for Carlton in 2009, scoring twelve goals. Late in the season, he, as well as teammates Cameron Cloke and Eddie Betts, was internally suspended by Carlton for one game after failing to attend a recovery session.

Garlett was made a nominated rookie in 2010, and earned regular selection in the Carlton team. He scored a career-high six goals in Round 19 against Essendon and was subsequently rewarded for this by taking out the NAB Rising Star nomination for the round; he ultimately polled five votes to finish sixth for the Rising Star Award. He played twenty games for the year, and performed strongly in the club's best and fairest, finishing seventh. Throughout the season, he formed part of a short-lived forward-line structure consisting of tall full-forward Setanta Ó hAilpín, and three small forwards (Garlett, Eddie Betts and Chris Yarran) who became known as "Setanta's Little Helpers".

Garlett signed a two-year contract extension with the Blues, and moved onto the senior list proper in 2011. He played every game in 2011, and kicked 50 goals for the year.

Melbourne (2015–2019)
On 9 October 2014, Garlett was traded to the Melbourne Football Club after an off-field incident involving him and teammate Mitch Robinson. After a 78-game stint at Melbourne, which included a leading goalkicker award in 2017, Garlett was delisted at the conclusion of the 2019 season.

Playing style
Garlett plays as a small crumbing forward, and his main attributes are his pace and tackling/defensive pressure, which is very effective in spite of his very light build.

Statistics
 Statistics are correct to the end of the 2019 season

|- style="background-color: #EAEAEA"
! scope="row" style="text-align:center" | 2009
|
| 38 || 10 || 12 || 9 || 72 || 22 || 94 || 34 || 23 || 1.2 || 0.9 || 7.2 || 2.2 || 9.4 || 3.4 || 2.3
|- 
! scope="row" style="text-align:center" | 2010
|
| 38 || 20 || 39 || 21 || 170 || 75 || 245 || 75 || 73 || 2.0 || 1.1 || 8.5 || 3.8 || 12.3 || 3.8 || 3.7
|- style="background-color: #EAEAEA"
! scope="row" style="text-align:center" | 2011
|
| 38 || 24 || 48 || 32 || 216 || 78 || 294 || 84 || 96 || 2.0 || 1.3 || 9.0 || 3.3 || 12.3 || 3.5 || 4.0
|- 
! scope="row" style="text-align:center" | 2012
|
| 38 || 22 || 29 || 27 || 195 || 69 || 264 || 78 || 72 || 1.3 || 1.2 || 8.9 || 3.1 || 12.0 || 3.5 || 3.3
|- style="background-color: #EAEAEA"
! scope="row" style="text-align:center" | 2013
|
| 38 || 22 || 43 || 29 || 189 || 79 || 268 || 66 || 76 || 2.0 || 1.3 || 8.6 || 3.6 || 12.2 || 3.0 || 3.5
|- 
! scope="row" style="text-align:center" | 2014
|
| 38 || 9 || 12 || 7 || 58 || 14 || 72 || 21 || 23 || 1.3 || 0.8 || 6.4 || 1.6 || 8.0 || 2.3 || 2.6
|-style="background-color: #EAEAEA"
! scope="row" style="text-align:center" | 2015
|
| 36 || 22 || 40 || 31 || 175 || 50 || 237 || 62 || 90 || 1.8 || 1.4 || 8.0 || 2.8 || 10.8 || 2.8 || 4.1
|- 
! scope="row" style="text-align:center" | 2016
|
| 36 || 17 || 29 || 14 || 124 || 53 || 177 || 34 || 54 || 1.7 || 0.8 || 7.3 || 3.1 || 10.4 || 2.0 || 3.2
|-style="background-color: #EAEAEA"
! scope="row" style="text-align:center" | 2017
|
| 36/67 || 21 || 42 || 28 || 171 || 65 || 236 || 56 || 74 || 2.0 || 1.3 || 8.1 || 3.1 || 11.2 || 2.7 || 3.5
|- 
! scope="row" style="text-align:center" | 2018
|
| 36 || 11 || 18 || 11 || 76 || 56 || 132 || 26 || 32 || 1.6 || 1.0 || 6.9 || 5.1 || 12.0 || 2.4 || 2.9
|-style="background-color: #EAEAEA"
! scope="row" style="text-align:center" | 2019
|
| 36 || 7 || 9 || 9 || 47 || 21 || 68 || 19 || 22 || 1.3 || 1.3 || 6.7 || 3.0 || 9.7 || 2.7 || 3.1
|- class="sortbottom"
! colspan=3| Career
! 185
! 321
! 218
! 1493
! 594
! 2087
! 543
! 635
! 1.7
! 1.2
! 8.1
! 3.2
! 11.3
! 2.9
! 3.4
|}

Personal life
Garlett has many relatives who are also Australian rules footballers. He is cousins with Lance Franklin, Cruize Garlett and Des Headland, and is the nephew of Leon Davis. He has a son, born in 2012.

References

External links

Jeff Garlett's profile from DemonWiki

1989 births
Living people
Australian rules footballers from Western Australia
Carlton Football Club players
Indigenous Australian players of Australian rules football
People from the Wheatbelt (Western Australia)
Swan Districts Football Club players
Melbourne Football Club players
Preston Football Club (VFA) players
Casey Demons players